Lisa Mishra is an American singer and songwriter. She is best known for her reprise version of the song Tareefan in the 2018 Indian film Veere Di Wedding. Since then, she has worked on songs like The Wakhra Song from the 2019 film Judgementall Hai Kya, Nadaaniyaan in the film The Sky Is Pink and also the party-anthem Chandigarh Mein from Good Newwz.

Early life
Mishra was born in Berhampur, Odisha and raised in Chicago. She graduated from Illinois Wesleyan University in Bloomington, Illinois with a double major in economics and religion and has a research background with both the Andrew Mellon Foundation and the Pluralism Project at Harvard University in Cambridge, Massachusetts. She started her own YouTube channel in 2007 when she was 13.
Her first studio experience was while lending vocals on the track "All We Got" on “Coloring Book (mixtape)” by Chance the Rapper.

Career
In 2017, Mishra collaborated with Jamila Woods to create the theme song of the Emmy-nominated web series Brown Girls.
On May 19, 2018, she uploaded a video on her Instagram handle singing a mashup of the Hindi song Tareefan and Let Me Love You. The mashup caught Sonam Kapoor Ahuja’s attention, and Mishra was subsequently flown down to India where she recorded and shot for the reprise version of the song for Veere Di Wedding, along with the other stars.

In 2019, Mishra signed with VYRL Originals, part of Universal Music India for non-film music.
In May 2019, she collaborated with composer-singer Vishal Mishra on Sajna Ve.
Mishra has also sung on Running Back To You, an uptempo dance/house record by Goa based producer and DJ Anish Sood released in February 2020.

Discography

Hindi film songs

Non-film songs

References

Living people
People from Brahmapur
Singers from Chicago
Singer-songwriters from Illinois
American women singer-songwriters
American playback singers
Bollywood playback singers
American women artists of Indian descent
American women singers of Indian descent
Expatriate musicians in India
American expatriates in India
Odia people
Indian emigrants to the United States
Illinois Wesleyan University alumni
Harvard University alumni
Year of birth missing (living people)
21st-century American singers
21st-century American women singers